George Augustus Howe, 3rd Viscount Howe (c. 1725 – 6 July 1758) was a career officer and a brigadier general in the British Army.  He was described by James Wolfe as "the best officer in the British Army". He was killed in the French and Indian War in a skirmish at Fort Ticonderoga the day before the Battle of Carillon, an ultimately disastrous attempt by the British to capture French-controlled Fort Carillon.

Background
Howe's father was Emanuel Scrope Howe, 2nd Viscount Howe, and mother was Mary Sophia von Kielmansegg (a niece of King George I), and he had two notable younger brothers, Richard Howe, Earl Howe and William Howe, 5th Viscount Howe, as well as seven other siblings. George was born either on the Howe estate at Langar, Nottinghamshire, or at the Howe home on Albemarle Street, London.

Early career
Howe joined the army as an ensign of the 1st Foot Guards in 1745 and saw service during the Flanders campaign of the War of the Austrian Succession. In 1746 he was made an aide-de-camp to the Duke of Cumberland who led the Allied Army in Flanders. In 1747 Howe fought at the Battle of Laufeld. He was promoted to lieutenant colonel in 1749 following the end of the war.

Ticonderoga campaign reforms

In 1758, in preparation for the attack on the French fort at Ticonderoga, which controlled access from Lake George to Lake Champlain, Lord Howe set about reforming General James Abercrombie's army for warfare in North America. He used his own 55th Regiment as an example for the rest of the army to follow. Howe had uniforms cut short, so that they came just to the men's waists, and all lace was removed from the coats as well. Infantrymen were issued leggings made of wool, in place of their linen and hemp canvas gaiters. Excess uniforms and equipment were done away with. The men's hair was cut short, Dr. Richard Huck wrote; "we are an army of round heads." Officers were not immune to his changes either, and he made himself an example of this, cutting his hair short. He washed his own clothes, and took very little baggage into the field.

His changes did not only affect the uniforms of the army but its tactics as well.  In the fall of 1757, Lord Howe had accompanied the famous ranger Major Robert Rogers on a scouting expedition.  In the spring he again met with Rogers to discuss warfare and tactics in the North American theater.  He began instructing the troops in Abercrombie's army in the manner of marching, forming, and fighting in the woods.  One observer stated that Lord Howe had trained his 55th Regiment so well that they were as "dexterious as rangers."

Many historians have credited Lord Howe with the creation of light infantry, and have called the 55th Regiment a light infantry regiment, however that was not the case.  While Lord Loudoun contemplated creating light infantry companies in each redcoat battalion, the idea was scrapped when Colonel Thomas Gage proposed to raise a regiment of Light Armed Foot, that became Gage's 80th Regiment.  They wore brown uniforms, instead of red and were the first British light infantry regiment.  At the Siege of Louisbourg, General Jeffery Amherst ordered his regiments to create light infantry companies.  Those companies were then placed into a light infantry battalion under the command of Colonel George Scott of the 40th Regiment.  The following year, as Commander-in-chief in North America, Amherst ordered each regiment in North America to create a light infantry company.

Seven Years War

On 2 February 1757, Howe was appointed colonel, 3rd Battalion of the 60th Foot (the Royal Americans, later the King's Royal Rifle Corps), but transferred to command the 55th Regiment of Foot on 28 September 1757 while at Halifax. In December he was promoted to Brigadier General.

In 1758 he and the regiment were part of General James Abercrombie's failed attack, the Battle of Carillon at Fort Ticonderoga. England's Prime Minister William Pitt had wanted Howe in command of this expedition rather than Abercrombie, but Abercrombie had more political contacts and seniority, so Howe was made second-in-command. On 6 July Abercrombie's force marched north from the shore of Lake George in four columns. Howe led one of these columns, with the 55th regiment accompanied by a unit of Connecticut militia, with Major Israel Putnam as a scout and guide. They made contact with a French detachment that had been separated from the main force and a sharp skirmish ensued. They fought well, taking 148 prisoners, and causing an estimated 300 enemy casualties with limited losses to their own number. But one of those casualties was General Howe, who died in Putnam's arms.

Aftermath

Howe was widely mourned on both sides of the Atlantic. The Massachusetts Assembly (or general court) later voted £250 to place a monument in Westminster Abbey by the sculptor Peter Scheemakers, which was erected in 1759.

Genealogy
George Augustus was brother to Admiral Richard Howe, 1st Earl Howe, 4th Viscount and Sir William Howe, 5th Viscount Howe.  The Family of Hoge quotes The Encyclopædia Britannica as having this to say about the Howes:
The friendliness of the brothers, Admiral Richard Howe and General William Howe, to the colonies led to their selection for the command of the British forces in the Revolutionary War. It was thought that they could negotiate a settlement with the American forces.

References

Bibliography
 Stoetzel, Donald I. Encyclopedia of the French & Indian War in North America, 1754–1763. Heritage Books, 2008.

External links

 

1725 births
1758 deaths
British Army brigadiers
British Army personnel of the French and Indian War
British Army personnel of the War of the Austrian Succession
Members of the Parliament of Great Britain for English constituencies
Whig (British political party) MPs
British MPs 1747–1754
British MPs 1754–1761
Viscounts in the Peerage of Ireland
Grenadier Guards officers
55th Regiment of Foot officers
Royal American Regiment officers
British military personnel killed in the Seven Years' War
George